The 2019–20 College of Charleston Cougars men's basketball team represents the College of Charleston during the 2019–20 NCAA Division I men's basketball season. The Cougars, led by fifth-year head coach Earl Grant, play their home games at the TD Arena in Charleston, South Carolina as members of the Colonial Athletic Association. In a season limited due to the COVID-19 pandemic, the Cougars finished the season 9–10, 6–4 CAA play to finish in third place. They lost in the quarterfinals of the CAA tournament to Drexel.

Following the season, head coach Grant was hired as the new coach at Boston College. Shortly thereafter, the school named Winthrop coach Pat Kelsey the team's new head coach.

Previous season
The Cougars finished the 2018–19 season 24–9, 12–6 in CAA play to finish in third place in the conference. At the CAA tournament they defeated Drexel before losing to Northeastern in the semifinals.

Offseason

Departures

2019 recruiting class

Roster

Schedule and results

|-
!colspan=12 style=| Exhibition

|-
!colspan=12 style=| Non-conference regular season
|-

|-
!colspan=12 style=| CAA regular season

|-
!colspan=12 style=| CAA tournament
|-

Source

References

College of Charleston Cougars men's basketball seasons
College of Charleston
College of Charleston
College of Charleston